48 Group may refer to:
 AKB48 Group, sister groups under AKS based in Japan
 SNH48 Group, sister groups under Star48 based in China
 BNK48 Group, sister groups under IAM based in Thailand
 48 Group Club, China-U.K. trade promotion organization